Marine Brevet (born 23 November 1994, in Viriat) is a former French artistic gymnast. She was a member of the team that won a bronze medal at the 2016 European Championships. She was supposed to represent France at the 2012 Summer Olympics, but a dislocated elbow one month before forced her to withdraw.  She represented France at the 2016 Summer Olympics where she finished eleventh with the French team, and individually she finished fifteenth in the all-around final.

References

French female artistic gymnasts
1994 births
Living people
Sportspeople from Ain
Gymnasts at the 2015 European Games
European Games competitors for France
Gymnasts at the 2016 Summer Olympics
Olympic gymnasts of France
21st-century French women